Polk is a village in Ashland County, Ohio, United States. The population was 336 at the 2010 census.

History
Polk was laid out in 1849. A post office called Polk has been in operation since 1846.

Geography
Polk is located at  (40.945541, -82.217374).

Notable people

Polk was the birthplace of Tully "Topsy" Hartsel, a Major League Baseball outfielder and World War II major general Stanley Eric Reinhart.

Demographics

2010 census
As of the census of 2010, there were 336 people, 129 households, and 87 families living in the village. The racial makeup of the village was 97.0% White, 0.3% African American, 0.9% from other races, and 1.8% from two or more races. Hispanic or Latino of any race were 2.4% of the population.

There were 129 households, of which 34.9% had children under the age of 18 living with them, 52.7% were married couples living together, 8.5% had a female householder with no husband present, 6.2% had a male householder with no wife present, and 32.6% were non-families. 27.9% of all households were made up of individuals, and 11.7% had someone living alone who was 65 years of age or older. The average household size was 2.60 and the average family size was 3.10.

The median age in the village was 39.3 years. 27.1% of residents were under the age of 18; 3.8% were between the ages of 18 and 24; 30.1% were from 25 to 44; 27.6% were from 45 to 64; and 11.3% were 65 years of age or older. The gender makeup of the village was 47.6% male and 52.4% female.

2000 census
As of the census of 2000, there were 357 people, 124 households, and 103 families living in the village. The population density was 354.1 people per square mile (136.5/km). There were 127 housing units at an average density of 126.0 per square mile (48.5/km). The racial makeup of the village was 98.60% White, 0.56% Native American, and 0.84% from two or more races.

There were 124 households, out of which 37.9% had children under the age of 18 living with them, 68.5% were married couples living together, 8.1% had a female householder with no husband present, and 16.9% were non-families. 13.7% of all households were made up of individuals, and 6.5% had someone living alone who was 65 years of age or older. The average household size was 2.88 and the average family size was 3.12.

In the village, the population was spread out, with 26.6% under the age of 18, 10.4% from 18 to 24, 30.3% from 25 to 44, 21.6% from 45 to 64, and 11.2% who were 65 years of age or older. The median age was 34 years. For every 100 females there were 87.9 males. For every 100 females age 18 and over, there were 91.2 males.

The median income for a household in the village was $41,875, and the median income for a family was $43,750. Males had a median income of $30,583 versus $21,250 for females. The per capita income for the village was $16,159. About 4.0% of families and 5.0% of the population were below the poverty line, including 10.5% of those under age 18 and 10.9% of those age 65 or over.

References

Villages in Ashland County, Ohio
Villages in Ohio
1849 establishments in Ohio
Populated places established in 1849